50th Birthday Celebration Volume 2 is a live album of improvised music by Milford Graves and John Zorn documenting their performance at Tonic in September 2003 as part of Zorn's month-long 50th Birthday Celebration concert series.

Reception

The Allmusic site awarded the album 4 stars. The authors of The Penguin Guide to Jazz called the album "a delightfully old-fashioned free-jazz blowout", and wrote: "Zorn reasserts himself as a player in this context with insouciant ease, and Graves is as magisterial as ever."

Track listing

Personnel
John Zorn – alto saxophone 
Milford Graves – drums, percussion

References

Albums produced by John Zorn
John Zorn live albums
2004 live albums
Tzadik Records live albums